Hattar is one of the 44 union councils, administrative subdivisions, of Haripur District in the Khyber Pakhtunkhwa province of Pakistan. It is located south of the district capital, Haripur, at 33°51'1N 72°51'8E and borders Taxila Tehsil of Punjab province.

Industrial Estate Hattar 
Industrial Estate Hattar is situated 16 kilometer at Kot Najibullah. There are around 400+ operational units that are mainly composed of food and beverage, textile, crockery, paper printing, chemical, cement, publishing, chemical, rubber, carpets and leather products. It is served by Hattar railway station.

References 

Union councils of Haripur District